Yukarıdanişment can refer to:

 Yukarıdanişment, Pasinler
 Yukarıdanişment, Savaştepe